Michel Ouellet (born March 5, 1982) is a Canadian former professional ice hockey right winger who played in the National Hockey League (NHL). Ouellet was selected by the Pittsburgh Penguins in the 4th round (124th overall) of the 2000 NHL Entry Draft.

He was drafted out of the Quebec Major Junior Hockey League (QMJHL) by the Pittsburgh Penguins of the National Hockey League (NHL) in 2000. He was named to the American Hockey League (AHL) All-Rookie Team with the Penguins' minor league affiliate, the Wilkes-Barre/Scranton Penguins in 2004. He has also played in the NHL with the Tampa Bay Lightning and Vancouver Canucks.

Playing career
As a youth, Ouellet played in the 1996 Quebec International Pee-Wee Hockey Tournament with the Rimouski Océanic minor ice hockey team. He later played for Rimouski Océanic in the QMJHL before being drafted 124th overall by the Pittsburgh Penguins in the 2000 NHL Entry Draft. He spent his first few years out of junior in the minor leagues and was named to the AHL All-Rookie Team with the Wilkes-Barre/Scranton Penguins in 2004.

He made his NHL début during the 2005–06 season, playing his first game on November 22, 2005 in a 5–4 victory against the Washington Capitals. Several games later, he scored his first NHL goal and assist in back-to-back games against the Buffalo Sabres on December 16 and 17. He finished his first NHL season with 16 goals and 16 assists in 50 games.

After a career-high 19 goals, 29 assists and 48 points, in 2006–07, Ouellet signed with the Tampa Bay Lightning. On December 14, 2007, he separated his left shoulder after a check from Calgary Flames defenceman Robyn Regehr and missed 18 games. He finished the season with 36 points in 64 games.

On September 29, 2008, Ouellet was placed on waivers due to a salary cutting effort by the Lightning. He cleared waivers and on October 6, he was traded along with Shane O'Brien to the Vancouver Canucks for Lukáš Krajíček and Juraj Šimek.
He was immediately assigned to the Manitoba Moose of the American Hockey League (AHL), but was recalled by the Canucks on November 3. He was returned to the Moose on November 10, 2008, where he completed the season with 40 points in 46 games.

Ouellet became an unrestricted free agent in the 2009 off-season, but went unsigned by an NHL club. He went overseas to Switzerland to play for HC Fribourg-Gottéron of the National League A. On December 21, 2009, Ouellet was named to Team Canada for the 2009 Spengler Cup. Canada finished in third place. After a half year Ouellet left Switzerland and signed with German club Hamburg Freezers of the Deutsche Eishockey Liga.

On July 1, 2011, Ouellet rejoined the Tampa Bay Lightning organization when they signed him as a free agent to a one-year, two-way contract. During the 2011–12 season, Ouellet failed to add to his NHL experience, however was assigned to the record achieving affiliate, the Norfolk Admirals contributing to their Calder Cup success. Prior to free agency on June 23, 2012, Ouellet was traded by the Lightning to the Boston Bruins, along with a 5th round draft pick, for Benoit Pouliot.

Released as a free agent by the Bruins, Ouellet accepted a try-out to the Hamilton Bulldogs training camp for the 2012–13 season on September 26, 2012. He was subsequently released upon completion of camp, due to the high number of players already under contract in the Bulldogs' camp.

After several months of free agency, Ouellet was offered a one-year contract with the Thetford Mines Isothermic of the LNAH on December 21, 2012. He finished out his playing career after two seasons in the LNAH.

Career statistics

Regular season and playoffs

International

Awards and honours

References

External links

1982 births
Living people
Canadian ice hockey right wingers
French Quebecers
Hamburg Freezers players
HC Fribourg-Gottéron players
Ice hockey people from Quebec
Manitoba Moose players
Norfolk Admirals players
People from Rimouski
Pittsburgh Penguins draft picks
Pittsburgh Penguins players
Rimouski Océanic players
Tampa Bay Lightning players
Thetford Mines Isothermic players
Vancouver Canucks players
Wilkes-Barre/Scranton Penguins players
Wheeling Nailers players
Canadian expatriate ice hockey players in Germany
Canadian expatriate ice hockey players in Switzerland